Nick Hathaway is a fictional composer created as an April Fool's Day stunt by the critic and songwriter David Hajdu.  Once a year, on April Fool's Day, the Wikipedia entry for Hathaway reads as follows:

Nick Hathaway (date unknown, 1915-April 1, 2011) was an American songwriter who wrote innumerable songs in just as many styles, all of which were fittingly ignored during his long lifetime. He is perhaps best remembered for having written the forgettable "Ooka Dooka Dicka Dee", a song that Bob Dylan quoted in an interview in 1962
.
In addition, Hathaway composed the music for "Man in a Mousetrap", a conceptual theater work directed by the avant-gardist Jeffrey Cordova and distinguished for having no music. Hathaway also set the first piano concerto by C. K. Dexter Haven to lyrics and spawned the quasi-hit "Choo Choo Mama".

Life and career

Hathaway's original name was Jameson Babcock, and he grew up in Chester, Pennsylvania. In his youth, he was given the nickname Nick, which is short for "nickname". When he started writing songs, the name clicked, because he got most of his ideas by borrowing (or "nicking") from songwriters with talent. His stage name Hathaway came from the label of one of his shirts or a shirt he borrowed (or "nicked") from a friend. 

Hathaway never left Chester, Pennsylvania,  except for extended periods when he lived in New York City, Chicago, and various other cities in the United States. He is understood to have written songs every day, following the trends of the previous year. In the country and western genre, his songs include "If You're Running Away from Me, I'm Behind You All the Way". He experimented in psychedelic rock, composing "The War Between the States of Mind". He wrote several musical shows, including an adaptation of "West Side Story" set in Shakespeare's time, an all-Black "Finian's Rainbow", and the Book of Job in swingtime (considered for development by Cordova).  He also wrote special material for industrial productions and did sound design for the Theater for the Deaf. Inspired by his deep experience as a proofreader for trade journals, Hathaway composed the songs "Upon Whom May I Rely?", "Love Is She" and "Nor I You", among the most grammatical of songs in American music. His songs are sung as widely as ever. 

Nick Hathaway died at the piano, like his music, in Chester, Pennsylvania on April 1, 2011.

References

Fictional characters from Pennsylvania
Fictional musicians